Step Sisters is a 2018 dance comedy film directed by Charles Stone III. It stars Megalyn Echikunwoke as a black sorority girl who agrees to teach the art of Greek stepping to a house of party-obsessed white sorority sisters.

Plot

Jamilah is an ambitious college student. She's president of her black sorority, captain of the highly regarded step team, a trusted liaison to the college dean, and has plans to attend Harvard Law School.

But after her school's reputation is tarnished by a band of hard-partying white sorority girls, Jamilah is forcibly enlisted to help set things right. She's tasked with not only teaching these girls how to step, but also helping them to win a competitive dance competition.

Cast

 Megalyn Echikunwoke as Jamilah
 Lyndon Smith as Danielle
 Eden Sher as Beth
 Sheryl Lee Ralph as Yvonne Bishop
 Gage Golightly as Libby
 Alessandra Torresani as Amber
 Nia Jervier as Saundra
 Marque Richardson as Kevin
 Robert Curtis Brown as Dean Berman
 Matt McGorry as Dane
 Naturi Naughton as Aisha

 L. Warren Young as Langston Bishop
 Ashlee Brie Gillum as Cheryl
 Jene Moore as Alani

Release
The film's main roles were cast in May 2016. The film was scheduled to be released on March 31, 2017 by Broad Green Pictures. However, it was ultimately pulled from the schedule. Shortly after, Netflix acquired distribution rights to the film, following Broad Green dropping the film, and it was released by Netflix on January 19, 2018.

Critical reception

See also
List of black films of the 2010s

References

External links
 

2010s buddy comedy films
2018 films
English-language Netflix original films
Films about fraternities and sororities
American dance films
American buddy comedy films
American female buddy films
2010s English-language films
Films directed by Charles Stone III
2018 comedy films
Tap dance films
2010s American films